Rudolf Bürger (31 October 1908 – 20 January 1980) was a Romanian international footballer and coach of German ethnicity in the 1920s and 1930s who is one of a few men who participated in each of the three pre-War FIFA World Cups.

Bürger played football for Ripensia Timişoara, the first professional team in Romania which came to prominence after 1932 under the direction of Rudolf Wetzer and was strong in the 1930s.

Wetzer was captain and coach of the Romania national team at the 1930 World Cup. Bürger did not play in the 2nd World Cup but made appearances in both the first and third editions of the tournament.

Honours

Player
Chinezul Timişoara
Liga I (1): 1926–27
Ripensia Timişoara
Liga I (4): 1932–33, 1934–35, 1935–36, 1937–38
Cupa României (2): 1933–34, 1935–36

References

External links

1908 births
1980 deaths
Sportspeople from Timișoara
People from the Kingdom of Hungary
Romanian footballers
Romania international footballers
Chinezul Timișoara players
FC Ripensia Timișoara players
Liga I players
Romanian football managers
FC Politehnica Timișoara managers
FC Ripensia Timișoara managers
1930 FIFA World Cup players
1934 FIFA World Cup players
1938 FIFA World Cup players
Romanian people of German descent
Association football defenders